Wyatt John Foster Cenac Jr. (born April 19, 1976) is an American comedian, actor, producer, and writer. He was a correspondent and writer for The Daily Show from 2008 to 2012. He starred in the TBS series People of Earth and in Barry Jenkins's first feature Medicine for Melancholy. He also hosted and produced the HBO series Wyatt Cenac's Problem Areas.

Early life
Cenac was born in New York on April 19, 1976 at St. Vincent's Hospital in Manhattan and spent his early years in the Bronx. His father, Wyatt Cenac Sr., was a cab driver born in Saint Mark Parish, Grenada in 1944. When Cenac was five, his father was shot and killed in his cab by a teenage passenger in Harlem. Cenac moved with his mother, a New York native, and Trinidadian stepfather to Dallas, Texas, in 1981. He spent his summers with his maternal grandmother in Crown Heights, Brooklyn in an apartment on President Street.

While in elementary school, he became friends with comic book writer Brian K. Vaughan, who also introduced him to comic books. He graduated from the Jesuit College Preparatory School of Dallas and the University of North Carolina at Chapel Hill before moving to Los Angeles. As of October 2014, Cenac lives in Fort Greene, Brooklyn, and previously lived in Prospect Heights during Hurricane Sandy in 2012.

Cenac is the nephew of the Hon. Mr. Justice Dunbar Cenac, Registry of the Eastern Caribbean Supreme Court. His father was the cousin of former deputy prime minister of Grenada Bernard Coard, who was imprisoned for 25 years following the American invasion of Grenada in October 1983. Cenac's paternal thrice-great-grandfather Cherebin Cenac was an officer from Agen, France, on a French battleship during the Napoleonic Wars who settled in Soufrière, Saint Lucia. Cherebin's youngest child, Francis (1830–1892), later emigrated to Grenada.

Career

Having previously worked for three years as a writer on King of the Hill, Cenac garnered public attention in The Doomed Planet comedy sketch in which he did an impression of then-senator Barack Obama, discussing possible campaign posters.

In June 2008, Cenac was hired as a correspondent and writer on The Daily Show with Jon Stewart.  After making several comedic appearances along with other correspondents, Cenac filed his first field report on July 21, 2008; titled "Baruch Obama," the report discussed Jewish voters' opinions of Democratic Presidential nominee Barack Obama. He continued to integrate satirical Black-oriented material in his Daily Show segments, including "Rapper or Republican" until his final Daily Show appearance on December 13, 2012. In a July 2015 appearance on WTF with Marc Maron, Cenac revealed that his departure from The Daily Show stemmed in part from a heated argument he had with Jon Stewart over a June 2011 Daily Show bit about Republican Presidential candidate Herman Cain. Despite this, Cenac appeared on Stewart's final episode of Daily Show; both agreed that they're "good", a reference to the Maron podcast.

In October 2009, he worked with rapper Slim Thug on the music video "Still a Boss", a parody of how the recession is affecting the rap community.  Cenac costarred in Medicine for Melancholy, an independent drama by Barry Jenkins released in 2008 that includes issues of African American identity and gentrification in San Francisco.

Cenac plays the voice of Lenny and Michael Johnson in the Nickelodeon animated series Fanboy & Chum Chum.

Cenac guest-starred on the MC Frontalot album Solved. Cenac's first hour-long comedy special, Comedy Person, premiered May 14, 2011, on Comedy Central.

In October 2014, Netflix released Cenac's second comedy special, Wyatt Cenac: Brooklyn. This album was nominated at the 58th Annual Grammy Awards for Best Comedy Album. In 2014, he guest-starred in an episode of the Netflix series BoJack Horseman. The following year, he appeared in a filmed segment with fellow comedians Rachel Feinstein and Alex Karpovsky on Last Week Tonight with John Oliver.

Cenac has also co-hosted four episodes of The Bugle podcast with Andy Zaltzman since 2016.

Cenac released his third stand up album "Furry Dumb Fighter" in 2016 both digitally and on vinyl. It was recorded in Madison, WI. Cenac reports that the album title is meant to sound like "freedom fighter."

Cenac's film roles include parts in Sleepwalk with Me and Hits, as well as a lead role in 2016's Jacqueline Argentine and 2017's festival hit, Fits and Starts, a film nominated for multiple awards, including the feature film grand jury prize at the prestigious South by Southwest film festival. Cenac released a web-series titled "aka Wyatt Cenac" about his life as a crime-fighting vigilante in a gentrifying Brooklyn. Cenac's HBO docuseries, "Wyatt Cenac's Problem Areas", premiered in April 2018. In August 2021, he signed a deal with Cartoon Network Studios and Warner Bros. Animation.

Filmography

Film

Television

References

External links

 
 

1976 births
African-American male comedians
American male comedians
American people of Grenadian descent
American comedy writers
American male film actors
American stand-up comedians
American male television actors
American television writers
American male television writers
American male voice actors
Jesuit College Preparatory School of Dallas alumni
Living people
University of North Carolina at Chapel Hill alumni
Male actors from Dallas
Male actors from New York City
Primetime Emmy Award winners
Comedians from New York City
Upright Citizens Brigade Theater performers
20th-century American comedians
21st-century American comedians
Screenwriters from New York (state)
Screenwriters from Texas
People from Fort Greene, Brooklyn
People from Prospect Heights, Brooklyn
20th-century African-American people
21st-century African-American people